York Railway Institute is a sports club in York, North Yorkshire, founded in 1886. The club plays football, rugby, tennis, and hockey. It is most notable for its football team, which won the Northern Counties East Division One championship during the 1987–88 season.

History
The club was formed as an association football club in 1886 by railway employees of the York railway station and were one of the first clubs to be formed in the city. York RI began playing sport at its current New Lane site in 1926.

Success came first for the rugby section of the club who captured the Yorkshire Shield during the 1950s. However, by the 1970s, the football club had climbed up to the Yorkshire League system.

York RI gained promotion from the third to second Yorkshire League during 1978–79, by capturing the championship. Two seasons later they gained promotion again, by finishing second in the league. While in that league York Railway Institute were playing against clubs such as Emley, North Ferriby United and Guiseley.

The Yorkshire League was brought to a close after 1982 and so York RI became founding members of the Northern Counties East Football League, specifically NCE Division One North.

The league system was re-ordered once again for 1985 and York Railway Institute were placed into NCE Division Two. Their first season in this league was a successful one, they finished third and gained promotion. This began the club's highest point in their history; they spent six seasons in NCE Division One. The club even won the league during 1987–88 beating out the likes of Garforth Town but for unknown reasons they were not promoted.

Recent times
From 1992 the club suddenly began to decline, dropping down the divisions to where they reside currently; York Football League Premier Division.

The rugby union club participates in the English rugby union system and currently plays in Yorkshire 4.

Honours

Northern Counties East Football League League Cup
Winners: 1987–88
NCEL Division One
Champions: 1987–88
NCEL Division Two
Promoted: 1985–86
Yorkshire League Division Two
1984 north riding county cup winners **Runners-up: 1980–81
Yorkshire League Division Three
Champions: 1978–79
York Football League
Champions: 1935–36, 1936–37, 1937–38, 1938–39, 1940–41, 1949–50, 1950–51, 1951–52, 1952–53, 1953–54, 1967–68
York Football League Division One
Champions: 1980–81
York Football League Division Two
Champions: 2007–08

Club records
Best league performance: Northern Counties East Football League Division One champions, 1987–88

References

Football clubs in England
Sport in York
Football clubs in North Yorkshire
1886 establishments in England
Yorkshire Football League
Northern Counties East Football League
York Football League
Association football clubs established in 1886
Railway association football teams in England